The Indian cricket team toured New Zealand from 25 February to 7 April 2009, playing a Test match series with New Zealand for the first time in five years. The tour included three Tests, five ODIs and two T20Is. New Zealand won both the T20Is.
India won both the ODI series 3–1 and Test series 1–0.

Squads

The Indian Squads were announced on 13 February. Dhawal Kulkarni got his maiden call up to the national squad, having been selected for the test squad after a strong debut Ranji trophy season where he was the highest wicket taker. L Balaji made a return to the Test squad after a five-year hiatus having last played in a test in 2004. Balaji was dropped from the ODI squad after he played in a single match in the previous tour, he was replaced by the now fit Munaf Patel. In the test squad Balaji replaced Pragyan Ojha with the selectors opting for an extra seamer instead of an extra spinner for the tour. Ojha retained his place in the ODI and T20 squads. Subramaniam Badrinath was dropped from the test squad in favour of reserve Wicket-Keeper Dinesh Karthik after Karthik too had a strong Ranji trophy season. Karthik was selected for all three squads, replacing Jadeja in the ODI squad. Ravindra Jadeja's impressive ODI debut was rewarded with a call up to the Twenty20 squad but Jadeja will be replaced by Sachin Tendulkar for the subsequent ODI series. Munaf Patel made a return to all three squads after having to pull out midway through the previous tour of Sri Lanka due to injury. Harbhajan Singh also made a return to all three squads after having to pull out at the beginning of the previous tour to Sri Lanka due to injury.

The New Zealand squad for the T20's was announced on 21 February. Jacob Oram Jesse Ryder and Ross Taylor returned after their injury. Oram however will only play as a batsman. Kyle Mills was injured and was replaced by Ewen Thompson. Ryder replaced Peter Fulton

Grounds
 AMI Stadium, Christchurch - Cap 36,500
 Basin Reserve, Wellington - Cap 11,600
 Eden Park, Auckland - Cap 50,000
 McLean Park, Napier - Cap 16,500
 Seddon Park, Hamilton - Cap 10,000
 Westpac Stadium, Wellington - Cap 33,500

T20I Series

1st T20I

2nd T20I

ODI series

1st ODI

2nd ODI

3rd ODI

4th ODI

5th ODI

Test series

First Test

Second Test

Third Test

References 
Menon, Suresh. "A bird in hand, Dhoni leaves the second in the bush." Dreamcricket, 8 April 2009.

Notes 

2009 in Indian cricket
2009 in New Zealand cricket
2008–09 New Zealand cricket season
2008-09
International cricket competitions in 2008–09